Bettel is a village in the commune of Tandel, in north-eastern Luxembourg.  , the village had a population of 207.

Until 1 January 2006, Bettel was part of the commune of Fouhren, which was merged with the commune of Bastendorf to form the modern commune of Tandel.

Bettel is situated on the river Our, just opposite the German border and the village of Roth an der Our.

Image gallery

Tandel
Villages in Luxembourg